e-Report - transnational virtual study circles: e-learning supports for tutorship and learning groups - is a communitarian project (funded by European Community - Leonardo da Vinci Program (EAC/11/04), 2005 – Procedure C) aiming at the constitution of a repertory of reference material with regard to the development of innovative methods in the field of e-learning system for educational projects and also for distance learning in VET. The activities of research, experimentation and analysis are combined with the use of ICT with massive use of tutoring activities, learning groups and transnational virtual study circles.

Project partners 
The network of the project is composed by:
 Università degli Studi di Palermo (University of Palermo), COT (Centro di Orientamento e Tutorato – Center of Guidance and Tutoring), Palermo, Italy.
 University of Salzburg - Zentrale Servicestelle für Flexibles Lernen und Neue Medien (Centre for Flexible Learning), Salzburg, Austria.
 Studien und Management Center (SMC Study and Management Center) Saalfelden GmbH, Austria.
 Confederación Empresarial de la Provincia de Alicante – COEPA The Business Confederation of the province of Alicante, Spain.
 EUREKA - Training Center, Palermo, Italy.
 Universitatea "Politehnica" din Timișoara/Polytechnic University of Timişoara, Romania.
 Departamentul de Educatie Permanenta/Centre for Continuing Education of Timisoara, Romania.
 (GVU) Högskolan på Gotland/Gotland College, Sweden.
 Department of Learning, Informatics, Management and Ethics (LIME) - Karolinska Institutet (KI) - Sweden.

Project aims 
e-Report is generally aimed at setting up a communitarian repertory of reference material with regard to the development of innovative methods in the field of e-learning system for distance learning in VET. It refers to activities of research, experimentation and analysis with regard to the development of innovative methods and contents in the field of e-learning, aiming at setting up a method of distance learning system, combining the use of ICT with tutoring activities, learning groups and transnational virtual study circles.
The specific goals of the project are:
 to analyse the developmental trends of the introduction of the ICT for training/education systems of 4 European countries (Austria, Italy, Romania, Sweden);
 to explore the relations between the training and educational supply of the partner countries and the main needs of the national VET systems in the field of e-learning and distance learning;
 to set up a repertory of shared educational and guidance materials and tools, useful for the transnational online education and training;
 to learn how to import standard compatible content in the existing e-learning platforms;
 to optimize a software platform LMS for the management via intranet and Internet of the transnational virtual study circle, in which the repertory realised through the project activities will be placed;
 to use in experimental way the reference material for educational and guidance activities in the field of e-learning with students and teachers in order to develop standardized learning solutions in this field, taking account of individual differences in learning, and special needs in education;
 to test the validity of educational/training methods and tools of the  transnational virtual study circle;
 to promote cooperation between EU countries, private and public, universities and vocational centres in this field;
 to transfer the developed method to the field of vocational training.

Description of the Project 
Four work-packages are contributing to the achievement of the project goals.

Work Package 1 
Work-package 1 (WP1 - context analysis) is aimed at comparing and studying the developmental trends of online courses in the national VET systems of the partners, a preliminary study will be conducted. From the results of this study, the main needs of the national VET systems will be identified and compared between four European countries.
In order to accomplish these goals two main actions will be carried out.
Action 1: to assess the quantitative/qualitative features of the online courses provided by universities and vocational institutes (OB1) through an on-line questionnaire that will be administered to a sample of 60 universities and vocational centers (see table 1). Three kind of questionnaires (6 forms) have been developed:
 Qa (1 & 2) for Responsibles of the online courses of Universities (Q1a) and Vocational Centers (Q2a). It has two sections (Section 1: General information about the U's or VC's e-learning policy; Section 2: General information about the on-line courses delivered by the U/VC).
 Qb (1 & 2) for Teachers/Trainers of the online courses of Universities (Q1b) and Vocational Centers (Q2b). It has three sections (Section 1: General information about teacher/trainer; Section 2: Information about the main courses delivered on-line; Section 3: Opinions about on-line training).
 Qc (1 & 2) for Students of the online courses of Universities (Q1c) and Vocational Centers (Q2c). It has three sections (Section 1: General information about student; Section 2: Information about the attended on-line courses; Section 3: Opinions about on-line training).
The questionnaires will be administered to a sample of 150 responsible and teachers/trainers and of 300 students belonging to the countries of the project (see table 2 and 3).
Action 2: to identify the main needs of the students attending Us and VCs with regard to the field of e-learning. A questionnaire will be developed, aimed at assessing: (a) their needs (e.g., enhancement of the use of ICT in their training or the improvement of occasions of virtual mobility), (b) their interests (e. g., the kind of courses they want to be enhanced); (c) their attitudes towards the use of ICT; (d) the influence of the lack of computer-based competencies (e.g. inability to use PC) on attitude towards on-line courses. 
The questionnaire will be administered online and by post to a sample of 320 students selected from the sample of universities and vocational school indicated above, 80 students for each country (50 of universities, 30 of vocational schools) and will be composed in the same ratio of: students who never attended an online course (160) and students who attended an online course at least one time (160). 
Finally, phone interviews with administrators, experts, teachers and trainers (n=52) will be performed, aimed at recognizing some indicators of the need of enhancing the online courses supply of each country.

Table 1. Composition of the sample of universities/vocational schools

Table 2. Composition of the sample of the trainers, teachers, experts, administrators

Table 3. Composition of the sample of the students of universities/vocational schools

Work Package 2 
Work-package 2 (WP2 - production of guidance and educational tools) is aimed at producing educational, guidance and training materials in digital format, suitable for the distance learning via the Internet and combining methodologies such as e-tutoring, peer-tutoring, learning groups and transnational virtual study circles. This set of materials (4 videos and 10 online courses) will be produced on the basis of the international exchange and the dissemination of good practices for the development of methods and tools in the field of distance learning.
The video will be 20 minutes long and will introduce the University’ e-learning and Erasmus project offers. It will be divided in chapter and will be available through the Internet, using the webTV streaming television channel, developed by the University of Palermo, but also on DVD to be suitable for students in home players. The on-line streaming version of the video will be made available using Open Source file format to improve quality and shareability of the content itself.
Each University will produce two courses, built around the e-learning concept, to be used on a LMS platform stressing  on two main educational aspects:
 the development group will check the typology and the quality of the teaching files, according to the new media adopted;
 at the same time, the main stress will be on the interaction between users and activities that will be made on-line.
On the basis of what agreed by each partner, tutoring will be the key factor of each e-learning action developed during the project.
The University of Palermo has released a specialized version of its own LMS, named Tutorfad (based on the Moodle LMS), to let the E-report group has its own development and exchange platform and to test the courses developed during the project.

Work Package 3 
Work-package 3 (WP3 - testing and evaluation), the shared repertory of guidance and educational materials and methods will be tested with a sample of teachers and students through the use of the LMS (based on Moodle). Furthermore, the transferability of the repertory to the field of vocational training will be experienced.
In order to accomplish these goals two main actions will be carried out.
 Action 1: testing of the repertory with a sample of 120 students attending the courses of the universities of the partnership. For each course (8), a target group of 15 students (10 student belonging to the country that developed the course and 5 belonging to the other countries of the partnership - "virtual mobility students"). In order to enhance the motivation of the students towards the experimentation of these virtual mobility processes, the courses attended will be recognized through a system of credit transfer (e.g. ECTS). The results of the testing phase will contribute to define the final configuration of the LMS and of the repertory of the transnational virtual study circle.
 Action 2: the repertory will be experienced also with a sample of students attending online courses of vocational training centers. For this purpose, 5 among vocational centers, organizations (belonging to Italy, Austria, Spain, Romania and Sweden) will select a course from the repertory; the on-line course will be tested to a sample of 15 people belonging to the target group of centre (total sample n = 75). At the end of testing the results will be assessed in order to understand the opportunity to generalize and transfer the repertory to the vocational training field.

Work Package 4 
Work-package 4 (Valorisation Plan). The project foresees a valorization plan during its entire life, composed by different activities of exploitation and dissemination of intermediate and final results. 
As regards Exploitation the following actions will be carried out: administration of questionnaires and evaluation schedules; analysis of the needs of the students, trainers/teachers, administrators (see WP1); realization of forum groups among teachers, experts and tutors; realization of forum groups among students; testing of the project's repertory, the evaluation and the monitoring of the training methods in U & VT; realization of focus groups with the end users; stakeholders involvement and consultation.
As regards Dissemination: Reports (local, national and transnational); Participation to conferences (local, national and international); Transnational meetings in each nation of the partnership; Web sites; Scientific publications (national and transnational), such as monograph, publications in reviews and journals; the realisation of guidance activities (e.g., guidance videos; guidance centre in the platform), aimed at promoting the project's output too; the realisation of a biannual e-newsletter in English language (published in the web-site); The distribution of CD/DVDs (1 CD/DVD aimed at presenting the project, in English and in the partners languages; 4 guidance CD/DVDs aimed at presenting the online courses and international exchange programs of U).

References

External links 
 IEEE Learning Technology - Volume 9 Issue 1 - January 2007
 The NETTIES Conference 2006
 Distance-Educator.com

Virtual learning environments
E-learning
Distance education in Europe
Information technology organizations based in Europe